The Battle of Helena was an American Civil War battle in 1863.

Battle of Helena may also refer to several conflicts:

Battle of Helena (431)
Battle of Lena (1208)
Battle of Helena (1863)
Battle of Elena (1877)